Charlois is a neighbourhood of the Dutch city of Rotterdam. It is located on the south bank of the Nieuwe Maas.

Charlois used to be a separate village; the municipality  Charlois existed until 1895, when it became part of Rotterdam.

History 
Charlois used to have an airport. Waalhaven airport as it was called, was the second civilian airport in service in the Netherlands after Schiphol during the period from 1920 to 1940. The airport was destroyed by the Dutch army so it would not get in the hands of the invading German Wehrmacht during World War II.

Born in Charlois
Leo Beenhakker (Coach of Trinidad & Tobago WC 2006)

References

 

Former municipalities of South Holland
Boroughs of Rotterdam
Neighbourhoods of Rotterdam